Leandro Despouy (April 4, 1947 – December 18, 2019), who was born in San Luis, Argentina, was an Argentine human rights lawyer. He was the United Nations Commission on Human Rights Special Rapporteur on the Independence of Judges and Lawyers from August 2003 until end of July 2009
..  He was also Special Rapporteur of the Sub-Commission on Prevention of Discrimination and Protection of Minorities 

Despouy was one of the five authors of a report on human rights abuses committed against the extrajudicial captives the United States detainees at its naval base at Guantanamo Bay, Cuba.

He played a significant role for the recognition of extreme poverty as a human rights issue within the United Nations system.

In 2016 he was awarded the Premio Konex

From 2002 to 2016, Despouy was the president of the Auditoría General de la Nación of the Argentine Republic.

References

  UN Cites Torture Reports At Gitmo, CBS News, June 23, 2005

1947 births
2019 deaths
People from San Luis, Argentina
20th-century Argentine lawyers
United Nations special rapporteurs
Members of the Sub-Commission on the Promotion and Protection of Human Rights
Argentine officials of the United Nations
21st-century Argentine lawyers